It is plain from many decrees in the Corpus Juris Canonici that the Roman Catholic Church has claimed and exercised the right, belonging to a perfect and visible society, of protecting its members by condemning the guilty to imprisonment. The object of prisons originally, both among the Hebrews and the Romans, was merely the safe-keeping of a criminal, real or pretended, until his trial. The ecclesiastical idea of imprisonment, however, is that confinement be made use of both as a punishment and as affording an opportunity for reformation and reflection.

Clerical punishment
This method of punishment was anciently applied even to clerics. Thus, Boniface VIII (cap. "Quamvis", iii, "De poen.", in 6) decrees:

The Church adopted the extreme punishment of perpetual imprisonment because, by the canons, the execution of offenders, whether clerical or lay, could not be ordered by ecclesiastical judges. It was quite common in ancient times to imprison in monasteries, for the purpose of doing penance, those clerics who had been convicted of grave crimes (c. vii, dist. 50). The "Corpus Juris", however, says (c. "Super His", viii, "De poen.") that incarceration does not of itself inflict the stigma of infamy on a cleric, as is evident from a papal pronouncement on the complaint of a cleric who had been committed to prison because he vacillated in giving testimony. The reply recorded is that imprisonment does not ipso facto carry with it any note of infamy.

Monastic prisons
As to monastic prisons for members of religious orders, we find them recorded in decrees dealing with the incorrigibility of those who have lost the spirit of their vocation. Thus, by command of Urban VIII, the Congregation of the Council (21 September 1624) decreed:

The crimes in question must be such as by natural or civil law would merit the punishment of death or imprisonment for life (Reiffenstuel, "Jus Can. univ.", no. 228). Innocent XII reduced the year required by the above-mentioned decree to six months (Decree "Instantibus", 2). A decree of the Sacred Congregation of the Council (13 November 1632) declares that a religious is not to be judged incorrigible because he flees from imprisonment, unless, after being punished three times, he should make a fourth escape. As the civil laws do not, at present, permit of incarceration by private authority, the Congregation on the Discipline of Regulars has decreed (22 January 1886) that trials for incorrigibility, preceding dismissal, should be carried out by summary, not formal, process, and that for each case recourse should be had to Rome. A vestige of the monastic imprisonment (which, of course, nowadays depends only on moral force) is found in the decree of Leo XIII (4 November 1892), in which he declares that religious who have been ordained and wish to leave their order cannot, under pain of perpetual suspension, depart from the cloister (exire ex clausura) until they have been adopted by a bishop.

See also

 Ecclesiastical court
 Ecclesiastical crime
 Ecclesiastical ordinance

Literature
 Ulrich L. Lehner: Monastic Prisons and Torture Chambers. Eugene, OR: 2013
 Ulrich L. Lehner: Im Klosterker der Moenche und Nonnen. Kevalaer: 2015 (completely revised and amended German edition)

Canon law of the Catholic Church
Prisons
Catholic penal canon law